Anatoli Viktorovich Davydov (born 13 November 1953) is a Russian professional football coach and a former player. He is the director of the academy for FC Zenit Saint Petersburg.

Career
Davydov made his professional debut in the Soviet Second League in 1971 for FC Metallurg Tula. He played two games in the UEFA Cup 1987–88 for FC Zenit Leningrad, the former name of Zenit Saint Petersburg. Davydov was one of the most respected and influential players during Zenit's golden era in the 1980s, and continued to play top-level competitive football until the record age of 43, then becoming a Zenit's coach. He also holds the club record for the most first team appearances - 454 official games, 53 games in Soviet Cup.

Davydov played for Chinese side Foshan Fosti in 1996. He hold the record for being the oldest person to have played in a professional Chinese football match aged 42 years and 348 days, as well as the oldest person to have scored in a professional Chinese football match aged 42 years and 292 days before 2018 when Zhuang Yi broke his records.

Personal life
His son Dmitri Davydov is a professional footballer.

Honours

Player
Zenit Leningrad
 Soviet Top League: 1984
 Soviet Super Cup: 1985

Manager
Zenit Saint Petersburg
Russian Cup: 1998–99

References

1953 births
Living people
Association football defenders
Soviet footballers
Russian footballers
Soviet Top League players
Russian Premier League players
Veikkausliiga players
FC Arsenal Tula players
FC Zenit Saint Petersburg players
FC Lada-Tolyatti players
PFC Krylia Sovetov Samara players
Russian football managers
FC Sibir Novosibirsk managers
FC Zenit Saint Petersburg managers
FC Tom Tomsk managers
Russian Premier League managers
FC Metallurg Lipetsk managers
Ponnistus Helsinki players
Soviet expatriate footballers
Russian expatriate footballers
Expatriate footballers in Finland
Foshan Fosti F.C. players
Expatriate footballers in China
FC Lokomotiv Saint Petersburg players
Russian expatriate football managers
Sportspeople from Tula, Russia